The 2017–18 Dayton Flyers men's basketball team represented the University of Dayton during the 2017–18 NCAA Division I men's basketball season. The Flyers were led by first-year head coach Anthony Grant and played their home games at the University of Dayton Arena as members of the Atlantic 10 Conference. They finished the season 14–17, 8–10 in A-10 play to finish in ninth place. They lost in the second round of the A-10 tournament to VCU.

Previous season
The Flyers finished the 2016–17 season 24–8, 15–3 in A-10 play to win the regular season A-10 championship. They received the No. 1 seed in the A-10 tournament where they lost in the quarterfinals to Davidson. They received an at-large bid to the NCAA tournament as the #7 seed in the South Region, where they lost in the first round to #10 Wichita State.

On March 25, 2017, head coach Archie Miller left the school to accept the head coaching position at Indiana. The school hired Dayton alum Anthony Grant as the new head coach on March 30.

Offseason

Departures

Recruiting class of 2017

Recruiting class of 2018

Preseason 
In a poll of the league’s head coaches and select media members at the conference's media day, the Flyers were picked to finish in fifth place in the A-10.

Roster

Schedule and results

|-
!colspan=9 style="background:#; color:#;"| Exhibition

|-
!colspan=9 style="background:#; color:#;"| Non-conference regular season

|-
!colspan=9 style="background:#; color:#;"|Atlantic 10 regular season

|-
!colspan=9 style="background:#; color:#;"|Atlantic 10 tournament

References

Dayton Flyers Men's
Dayton Flyers men's basketball seasons
Dayton
Dayton